San Antonio del Táchira is a city in the Venezuelan Andean state of Táchira.  The busy highway across the Simón Bolívar International Bridge linking the cities of Cúcuta, Colombia, and San Cristóbal, Venezuela, passes through San Antonio del Táchira, making it an important gateway between the two nations.  This city is the shire town of the Municipio Bolívar de Táchira and, according to the 2001 Venezuelan census, the municipality has a population of 48,171.

History
General Simón Bolívar passed through this city during his Admirable Campaign on March 1, 1813.

Demographics
The Bolívar Municipality, according to the 2001 Venezuelan census, has a population of 48,171 (up from 39,752 in 1990).  This amounts to 4.9% of Táchira's population.  The municipality's population density is 611.6 people per square mile (236.13/km²).

Government
San Antonio del Táchira is the shire town of the Bolívar Municipality in Táchira.  The mayor of the Bolívar Municipality is Juan Vicente Cañas Alviarez, elected in 2004 with 48% of the vote.  He replaced Ramon Vivas shortly after the last municipal elections in October 2004.

Economy

Transportation

Airport
The city's airport, Juan Vicente Gómez International Airport, is located 2 kilometers northeast of the city.

Bridges
The Simón Bolívar International Bridge, crossing the Táchira River leads to Cúcuta in Colombia.

Sites of interest

Squares and parks
Plaza Bolívar (located between carreras 9 and 10 and calles 3 and 4)
Plaza Miranda (located between carreras 12 and 13 and calles 4 and 5)

References

External links
bolivar-tachira.gob.ve  
Facts & figures of the Bolívar Municipality  
Information on the Bolívar Municipality 
More information on the Bolívar Municipality 

Cities in Táchira
Populated places established in 1724
1724 establishments in the Spanish Empire